Bonaventure Sokambi (born 1 January 1992) is a Gabonese professional footballer who currently plays as a forward for Elite One club Aigle Royal Menoua.

Honours 
CF Mounana
Runner-up
 Gabon Championnat National D1: 2012–13, 2013–14

References

External links 
 
 

1992 births
2015 Africa Cup of Nations players
Algerian Ligue Professionnelle 1 players
ASO Chlef players
CR Belouizdad players
Expatriate footballers in Algeria
Gabon international footballers
Gabonese footballers
Gabonese expatriate footballers
Gabonese expatriate sportspeople in Algeria
Living people
Association football forwards
AS Stade Mandji players
21st-century Gabonese people
Gabon A' international footballers
2014 African Nations Championship players